Radoslav Vanko (born in 1983, in Žilina, Slovakia), is a Slovak model. Vanko graduated from the faculty of physical education and sport with a master's degree as a teacher and personal trainer.

Career
Vanko has modeled for Valentino, Dolce and Gabbana, Giorgio Armani, Gucci, Pierre Cardin, Louis Vuitton and Prada. He has appeared on the cover of Men's Health and DNA.

References

External links
 http://www.bellazon.com/main/topic/45459-radoslav-vanko/
 https://www.bearwww.com/blog/radoslav-vanko-enflamme-le-nouveau-dna/

Slovak male models
1983 births
Living people
Date of birth missing (living people)